Kalpin County is a county in the Xinjiang Uyghur Autonomous Region and is under the administration of the Aksu Prefecture. The overwhelmingly Uyghur population of the county lives on oases at the base of the Tian Shan mountains and on the edge of the Taklamakan Desert.

History

In 1902, a xiancheng was created at Kalpin. In 1930, a xianzhi was created at Kalpin.

According to Radio Free Asia, in 2008, Chinese authorities demolished a Uyghur mosque  from the Upper Kumtagh village in Kalpin County because the mosque was said to be illegally built and said to have been conducting illegal religious activities.

On February 20, 2009, a 5.2 magnitude earthquake struck at a location  from the county seats of Kalpin and Akqi counties. 207 aftershocks had been recorded by 11 AM on February 22. More than ten thousand houses were damaged and 182 were destroyed. Forty tents were set up and 12,400 people were relocated. The county received one million CNY in rescue funds from nearby government offices.

On April 12, 2014 at 11:40 PM, Abdulbasit Ablimit (Abdubasit Ablimit), 17, of Qum’eriq village in Yurqi (Yurchi, Yu'erqi), was shot and killed by police while riding a motorcycle. Two other Uyghurs were injured. Four to five hundred people from their village participated in a protest at the county office demanding that the police officer be punished according to law. More than thirty of the protesters were detained and some were beaten. Tianshannet reported that on the following Wednesday, a man in Urumqi was detained by police for spreading rumors about the incident. The Uyghur American Association condemned the killing.

On April 3, 2015, Aqal (Aqiale, Achal), then a township, was made a town.

According to research presented in The Diplomat, Xinjiang Nuodun Garment Co., Ltd., a company based in Kalpin County, was founded in July 2017. The company has made shipments of men and women's trousers to four companies in the United States. The company is also mentioned in the context of Aksu Prefecture's wider policy related to re-education camps in the Aksu Daily.

Geography
The county is made up of territory in the Tian Shan mountain range and the Taklamakan Desert. Kalpin, Gezlik and Yurqi are located west of Aqal. Qilan is located east of Aqal on the border with Aksu City. Mountain ranges in the county include Bozake Tagh, Kelpin Chöl Tagh, Chong Kizil Tagh, Kankerin Tagh, Chong Korum Tagh and Akin Bek Tagh.  Rivers and streams in the county include Koram Boghuz, Chilan Su and Sargan.

Climate

Administrative divisions
, Kalpin County included three towns and two townships:

Towns ( / ):
Kalpin Town (Keping, Kelpin,  / ), Gezlik (Gaizilike;  / ), Aqal (Aqiale, Achal;  / , formerly Achal Township )

Townships ( / ):
Yurqi Township (Yurchi, Yu'erqi;  / ),  Qilan Township (Qilang, Chilan;  / )

Economy
Kalpin County's economy is primarily agricultural, producing wheat, corn, sorghum, cotton, etc. Animal husbandry is also strong, including the raising of camels, sheep and other animals. Mineral resources include sulfur. Industries include mining, concrete and cotton processing among others.

Spoons and other tableware made from the fragrant wood of apricot trees are a traditional product produced in the county.

There is 126,000 mu of arable land in the county. , there was about 4,270 acres (28,164 mu) of cultivated land in Kalpin.

Demographics 

As of 2015, 53,804 of the 55,425 residents of the county were Uyghur, 1,501 were Han Chinese and 120 were from other ethnic groups.

As of 1999, 97.31% of the population of Kalpin County was Uyghur and 2.54% of the population was Han Chinese.

Transportation
 China National Highway 314

Historical maps
Historical English-language maps including Kalpin:

See also
 Glycomyces tarimensis, discovered in soil from the county

Notes

References

External links

 《远方的家》 20200129 美食过大年 最是难忘家乡味| CCTV中文国际  (includes a segment on food in Kalpin County)

County-level divisions of Xinjiang
Aksu Prefecture